Quercus phellos, the willow oak, is a North American species of a deciduous tree in the red oak group of oaks. It is native to the south-central and eastern United States.

Description
The tree starts acorn production around 15 years of age, earlier than many oak species.

Willow oaks can grow moderately fast (height growth up to  a year), and tend to be conic to oblong when young, rounding out and gaining girth at maturity (i.e. more than 50 years).

Distribution and habitat 

The species is most common in the American south and eastern states. It can be found from Long Island Sound south to northern Florida, and west to southernmost Illinois, Missouri, Oklahoma, and eastern Texas. Its natural range extends into southeastern Pennsylvania and southern New Jersey. It has also historically been recorded as occurring in Lancaster, Bucks, Chester, Delaware, and Philadelphia counties, chiefly on wet sites, occasionally in drier, upland ones. Much of that area has been built over and developed since World War II, and the tree is now classified as endangered in the state.

Ecology 
The acorns are eaten by squirrels and other wildlife.

Uses 

Economic uses are primarily as an ornamental tree and the wood for pulp and paper production, but also for lumber; it is often marketed as "red oak" wood.

The willow oak is one of the most popular trees for horticultural planting, due to its rapid growth, hardiness, balance between axial and radial dominance, ability to withstand both sun and shade, light green leaf color and full crown. Despite being heavily used in landscaping in the Southern US (in cities such as Washington, D.C., Raleigh, Charlotte, and Atlanta) around malls, along roads, etc., the trees tend to grow larger than planners expect, which often leads to cracked sidewalks.

References

External links
 USDA Natural Resources Conservation Service: Quercus phellos Plant Profile
 Quercus phellos information and images from Vanderbilt University
 Interactive Distribution Map of Quercus phellos
 photo of herbarium specimen at Missouri Botanical Garden, collected in Missouri in 1897

phellos
Trees of the United States
Trees of the Southeastern United States
Flora of the Southern United States
Plants described in 1753
Taxa named by Carl Linnaeus